Elections to Newcastle-under-Lyme Borough Council were held on 4 May 2000.  One third of the council was up for election and the Labour Party kept overall control of the council.

After the election, the composition of the council was:
Labour 30
Liberal Democrat 16
Conservative 9
Independent 1

Election result

References
2000 Newcastle-under-Lyme election result

2000
2000 English local elections
2000s in Staffordshire